The Martin B-57 Canberra was first manufactured in 1953, and the United States Air Force had accepted a total of 403 B-57s before production ended in early 1957.  The last USAF B-57 was retired in 1983.

It was the last tactical bomber used by the United States Air Force, being engaged in combat operations during the Vietnam War (1963–1971).  It also performed a wide variety of other missions.  This list is of the units it was assigned to, missions performed, and the bases it was stationed.

Units

Tactical Bombardment
The B-57B Tactical Bomber was the replacement for the World War II B-26 Invader.  Assigned to TAC, USAFE, PACAF.  202  aircraft produced.  Production began in 1952, deliveries began in 1954. TAC aircraft sent to Air National Guard by 1958, being replaced by F-100 Super Sabre.   USAFE aircraft withdrawn from France in 1957 by agreement with French Government.

PACAF 8th and 13th Bombardment Squadrons flew B-57B Tactical Bombers in combat during Vietnam War, 1964–1969. The B-57G modification (Tropic Moon Night Intruder, 18 B-57B aircraft modified, 1968–1969) flew in combat 1970–1972.   Last aircraft retired from Air National Guard, 1974.

The B-57Cs was a limited-production dual-control trainer version of the B-57B (1954–1958).  38 produced.  A small number of B-57Cs were later re-equipped and redesignated as RB-57C for service alongside RB-57A Reconnaissance aircraft as trainers when the latter were issued to ANG units.

 3d Bombardment Wing, Tactical (B-57B/C) (PACAF)
 Johnson AB, Japan, 1956–1960
 Yokota AB, Japan, 1960–1963
 8th Bombardment Squadron, Tactical 
 13th Bombardment Squadron, Tactical 
 90th Bombardment Squadron, Tactical

 345th Bombardment Wing, Tactical (B-57B/C) (TAC)
 345th Bombardment Group (1954–1957) received first production USAF B-57Bs, July 1954
 Langley AFB, Virginia, 1954–1959
498th Bombardment Squadron, Tactical
499th Bombardment Squadron, Tactical
500th Bombardment Squadron, Tactical
501st Bombardment Squadron, Tactical

 461st Bombardment Wing, Tactical (B-57B/C) (TAC)
 Hill AFB, Utah, 1955–1956
 Blytheville AFB, Arkansas, 1956–1958
 764th Bombardment Squadron, Tactical
 765th Bombardment Squadron, Tactical
 766th Bombardment Squadron, Tactical

 3510th Combat Crew Training Wing,  (B-57B/C) (ATC)
 Randolph AFB, Texas, 1954–1956
 3511th Combat Crew Training Squadron

 17th Bombardment Group, Tactical (B-57B/C) (TAC)
 Hurlburt Field, Florida, 1955–1956
 34th Bombardment Squadron, Tactical

 38th Bombardment Group, Tactical (B-57B/C) (USAFE)
Laon-Couvron AB, France, 1955–1957
 71st Bombardment Squadron, Tactical
 405th Bombardment Squadron, Tactical
 822d Bombardment Squadron, Tactical

 41st Air Division (B-57B) (PACAF)
 Yokota Air Base, Japan, 1964
 8th Bombardment Squadron, Tactical
 13th Bombardment Squadron, Tactical

 405th Fighter Wing (B-57B) (PACAF)
 Clark Air Base, Philippines, 1965–1968
 8th Bombardment Squadron, Tactical   (Tail Code: PQ)
 13th Bombardment Squadron, Tactical  (Tail Code: PV)
 Both squadrons performed rotating temporary duty at:
 Tan Son Nhut Air Base, Bien Hoa Air Base, Da Nang Air Base, South Vietnam, 1965–1968

 35th Tactical Fighter Wing (B-57B) (PACAF)
 Phan Rang Air Base, South Vietnam, 1968–1969
 8th Bombardment Squadron, Tactical   (Tail Code: PQ)
 13th Bombardment Squadron, Tactical  (Tail Code: PV)

 15th Tactical Fighter Wing (B-57G) (TAC)
 MacDill AFB, Florida, 1969–1972 
 13th Bombardment Squadron, 1969–1970 (Tail Code: FS)
 4424th Combat Crew Training Squadron, 1969–1972 (Tail Code: FS)

 8th Tactical Fighter Wing (B-57G) (PACAF)
 Ubon RTAFB, Thailand, 1970–1972
 13th Bombardment Squadron (Tail Code: FK)

Tactical Reconnaissance
The RB-57A was the replacement for the RB-26 night reconnaissance aircraft.  67 produced.   The aircraft was filled with various cameras and was unarmed, its mission  being day and night, high and low, and visual and photographic reconnaissance.  It filled the photo-reconnaissance mission of the RB-26, but were not reliable and also had a high accident rate.   Replaced by the RB-66B Destroyer and RF-101C Voodoo by 1958; survivors sent to the Air National Guard.  Some were converted to Air Defense Command EB-57A electronic warfare aircraft to provide training for air defense radar units.  By 1973, most of the surviving R/EB-57A's had been retired to AMARC at Davis Monthan AFB, Arizona. A few were converted to RB-57F strategic reconnaissance/weather reconnaissance aircraft.

Ten RB-57As were modified for high-altitude strategic reconnaissance over non-friendly areas under "Project Heartthrob".  Designated RB-57A-1s, they flew high-altitude reconnaissance missions over Eastern Europe, Communist China and North Korea in the late 1950s.  Two other RB-57As, designated RB-57A-2 were modified with a bulbous nose containing AN/APS-60 mapping radar and a SIGINT direction finder system in 1957 under project SARTAC.

Eight RB-57Es were modified from B-57E Target Towing aircraft and were fitted with cameras and other sensors as part of the "Patricia Lynn Project" during the Vietnam War.   They were used in spotting Viet Cong river traffic at night along the Mekong Delta southeast of Saigon. In 1969/70, Patricia Lynn missions were flown into Laos and into Cambodia. The Patricia Lynn operation was terminated in mid-1971. 
 

 10th Tactical Reconnaissance Wing (RB-57A) (USAFE)
 1st Tactical Reconnaissance Squadron
 Spangdahlem AB, West Germany, 1954–1957

 363d Tactical Reconnaissance Wing (RB-57A) (TAC)
 22d Tactical Reconnaissance Squadron
 41st Tactical Reconnaissance Squadron
 43d Tactical Reconnaissance Squadron
 Shaw AFB, South Carolina, 1954–1956
 (First USAF operational B-57 wing)

 66th Tactical Reconnaissance Group (RB-57A) (USAFE)
 30th Tactical Reconnaissance Squadron
 Sembach AB, West Germany. 1954–1958

 33d Tactical Group, Detachment 1,  (RB-57E) (PACAF)
 Re-designated: 6250th Combat Support Group Detachment 1
 Re-designated: 460th Tactical Reconnaissance Wing, Detachment 1 
 Tan Son Nhut AB, South Vietnam, 1963–1971
 Also operated from: Da Nang AB, South Vietnam

 6021st Reconnaissance Squadron (RB-57A-1) (FEAF)
 Yokota AB, Japan, 1955–1957
 7407th Support Squadron (RB-57A-1, RB-57A-2) (USAFE)
 Wiesbaden AB, West Germany, 1955–1957

Strategic Reconnaissance
The RB-57D was a high-altitude strategic reconnaissance aircraft.  20 produced.  Extended wing with higher thrust engine modification of B-57B, operated in lower stratosphere.   Operations remain largely classified (1957–1963).  Replaced by Lockheed U-2.

The RB-57F was the result of an early-1960s program to produce a virtually new high-altitude reconnaissance aircraft out of the B-57.  21 produced.  Developed from some RB-57As, RB-57Bs, and RB-57Ds in 1963 with newer engines and wider wings.   Used for strategic reconnaissance.  Transferred to Air Weather Service as WB-57Fs, 1968

Two WB-57Fs are the only B-57 aircraft model still flyable and in service (NASA, 2011).

 4080th Strategic Reconnaissance Wing (RB-57D) (SAC)
 4028th Strategic Reconnaissance Squadron
 Detachment 1 operated from: Yokota AB, Japan
 Detachment 2 operated from: Eielson AFB, Alaska
 Turner AFB, Georgia, 1956–1957
 Laughlin AFB, Texas, 1957–1959

 6091st Reconnaissance Squadron (RB-57F) (PACAF)
 Yokota AB, Japan, 1963–1968 
 556th Reconnaissance Squadron (RB-57F) (PACAF)
 Yokota AB, Japan (RB-57F), 1968–1972
 7407th Support Squadron (RB-57D, RB-57F) (USAFE)
 Wiesbaden AB, West Germany, 1957–1964 (D), 1963–1974 (F)

Weather Reconnaissance
B/RB-57C/D/E/Fs operated by the Air Weather Service.   WB-57Ds used for high altitude atmospheric sampling for nuclear weapons testing/monitoring.   WF-57Fs were remaining RB-57Fs re-designation after June, 1968.  Used for high-altitude weather monitoring and occasionally fitted with cameras for clandestine strategic reconnaissance flights.  Retired 1981.

 4926th Test Squadron (Sampling) 
 Re-designated: 1211th Test Squadron  (Sampling)
 Kirtland AFB, New Mexico,  1955–1963 (B-57B), 1957–1963 (RB-57D)
 55th Weather Reconnaissance Squadron (RB-57F)
 McClellan AFB, California, 1963–1964
 55th Weather Reconnaissance Squadron, Detachment 1 (RB-57F)
 Eielson AFB, Alaska, 1963–1964
 56th Weather Reconnaissance Squadron, (WB-57B, R/WB-57F) 
 Yokota AB, Japan, 1962–1964, 1966–1972

 57th Weather Reconnaissance Squadron,  (WB-57B, R/WB-57F)  
 Avalon Airport, Melbourne, Victoria, Australia, 1962–1969
 58th Weather Reconnaissance Squadron (WB-57C, WB-57E, R/WB-57F)
 Kirtland AFB, New Mexico, 1 Feb 1964-1 Jul 1974
 Detachment: RAAF Base East Sale, Victoria, Australia (R/WB-57F)
 Detachment: El Plumerillo International Airport, Argentina (R/WB-57F)
 58th Weather Reconnaissance Squadron, Detachment 1, Eielson AFB, Alaska (R/WB-57F)

Tow Target
Dedicated Air Defense Command target towing aircraft used for training of F-86D Sabre, F-94C Starfire, and F-89D Scorpion interceptors firing 2.75-inch Mk 4/Mk 40 Folding-Fin Aerial Rockets.  68 produced.  As F-102 Delta Dagger interceptors firing heat-seeking AIM-4 Falcon air-to-air missiles became available, the target towing mission of the B-57E became obsolete, and beginning in 1960 the B-57Es were adapted to electronic countermeasures and faker target aircraft (EB-57E).

In order to cover combat losses in the Vietnam War, twelve B-57Es were reconfigured as combat-capable B-57Bs at the Martin factory in late 1965 and were deployed to Southeast Asia for combat.  Six converted to RB-57E "Patricia Lynn" tactical reconnaissance aircraft during the Vietnam War.  Retired 1974.

 7272d Air Base Group (USAFE)
 Wheelus AB, Libya, 1957–1961
 1st Aerial Target Squadron (ADC)
 Re-designated: 1st Tow Target Squadron
 Biggs AFB, Texas, 1957–1960
 3d Tow Target Squadron (TAC)
 George AFB, California, 1957–1960
 4756th Tow Target Squadron (ADC)
 Tyndall AFB, Florida, 1957–1960

 8d Bombardment Squadron, TT Flight (PACAF)
 Re-designated: 6th Tow Target Squadron
 Johnson AB, Japan, 1957–1960
 17th Tow Target Squadron (ADC)
 Yuma AFB, Arizona. 1957–1959
 MacDill AFB, Florida, 1959–1960

Defense Systems Evaluation
Used by Air Defense Command as simulated target aircraft for interceptors and training of ground control intercept radar units.   Used re-purposed RB-57As, B-57Bs, B-57Cs, B-57E as they became available from their previous missions.   Used by active duty units until 1971; Air National Guard until 1983.

 4677th Defense System Evaluation Squadron, (RB-57B, EB-57E)
 4677th Defense System Evaluation Squadron, Detachment 1, Holloman AFB, New Mexico (RB-57D)
 Re-designated: 17th Defense Systems Evaluation Squadron
 Hill AFB, Utah, 1959–1972
 Malmstrom AFB, Montana, 1972–1979

 5040th Radar Evaluation Squadron (EB-57B) (AAC) (10th AD)
 Re-designated: 5070th System Evaluation Squadron 
 Elmendorf AFB, Alaska, 1957–1960

 5041st Tactical Operations Squadron (EB-57) (AAC) (21st CW)
 Elmendorf AFB, Alaska, 1971–1977

 4758th Defense Systems Evaluation Squadron (EB-57E) 
 Biggs AFB, Texas, 1958–1960
 Holloman AFB, New Mexico, 1960–1968

 4713th Defense Systems Evaluation Squadron (EB-57A/B/E)
 Stewart AFB, New York, 1959–1969
 Otis AFB, Massachusetts, 1969–1972
 Westover AFB, Massachusetts, 1972–1974

 6091st Reconnaissance Squadron (EB-57E)
 Yokota AB, Japan
 Re-designated: 556th Reconnaissance Squadron
 Moved to Kadena AB, Okinawa.

Air National Guard

 106th Tactical Reconnaissance Wing
 149th Tactical Reconnaissance Squadron (RB-57A), 1 Aircraft
 Virginia Air National Guard
 Richmond ANGB, VA, Apr–Jun 1958

 110th Tactical Reconnaissance Group
 172d Tactical Reconnaissance Squadron (RB-57A/C)
 Michigan Air National Guard
 Battle Creek ANGB, MI, 1958–1971

 123d Tactical Reconnaissance Group
 162d Tactical Reconnaissance Squadron (RB-57B)
 Kentucky Air National Guard
 Louisville ANGB, KY, 1958–1965

 152d Tactical Reconnaissance Group
 192d Tactical Reconnaissance Squadron (RB-57A/C)
 Nevada Air National Guard
 Reno ANGB, NV, 1961–1965

 158th Defense Systems Evaluation Group
 134th Defense Systems Evaluation Squadron (EB-57B/C)
 Vermont Air National Guard
 Burlington ANGB, VT
 Last USAF unit to operate B-57s, 1974-retired 1983.

 189th Tactical Reconnaissance Group
 154th Tactical Reconnaissance Squadron (RB-57A)
 Arkansas Air National Guard
 Little Rock Air Force Base, AR, 1958–1965

 190th Tactical Reconnaissance Group
 Re-Designated: 190th Defense Systems Evaluation Group
 117th Tactical Reconnaissance Squadron (RB-57A, B-57G)
 Re-Designated: 117th Defense Systems Evaluation Squadron, (EB-57B)
 Kansas Air National Guard
 Naval Air Station Hutchinson, KS, 1958
 Forbes Air Force Base, KS, 1967–1976

Operational Support
Used by Air Force Systems Command at Edwards AFB, California and Eglin AFB Florida for functional test flights and modification testing.  Also for various special projects such as hurricane monitoring; Air Force Special Weapons Center; high altitude research; aircraft missile launch testing; missile guidance systems testing, FAA and NASA research projects.

 1001st Operations Group, Andrews AFB, Maryland
 Star Flight, 1958–1962
 4950th Test Wing, Wright-Patterson AFB, Ohio
 6550th Operations Squadron, Patrick AFB, Florida
 Rome Air Development Center, Griffiss AFB, New York
 HQ, Air Defense Command, Peterson AFB, Colorado

 Air Force Flight Test Center, Edwards AFB, California
 Air Armament Center, Eglin AFB, Florida
 Federal Aviation Administration
 United States Department of Commerce (Weather)
 NASA, Ellington Field, Texas

References
 Mikesh, Robert C. Martin B-57 Canberra: The Complete Record. Atglen, Pennsylvania: Schiffer Publishing Ltd., 1995. .
 Mueller, Robert. Air Force Bases Volume I: Active Air Force Bases Within the United States of America on 17 September 1982. Office of Air Force History, 1989.
 Ravenstein, Charles A. Air Force Combat Wings Lineage and Honors Histories 1947–1977. Office of Air Force History, 1984.
 Baugher, Martin B-57

United States military aircraft